Cuscuta, commonly known as dodder or amarbel, is a genus of over 201 species of yellow, orange, or red (rarely green) parasitic plants. Formerly treated as the only genus in the family Cuscutaceae, it now is accepted as belonging in the morning glory family, Convolvulaceae, on the basis of the work of the Angiosperm Phylogeny Group. The genus is found throughout the temperate and tropical regions of the world, with the greatest species diversity in subtropical and tropical regions; the genus becomes rare in cool temperate climates, with only four species native to northern Europe.

Folk names include: strangle tare, scaldweed, beggarweed, lady's laces, fireweed, wizard's net, devil's guts, devil's hair, devil's ringlet, goldthread, hailweed, hairweed, hellbine, love vine, pull-down, strangleweed, angel hair, and witch's hair.

Description
Cuscuta can be identified by its thin stems appearing leafless, with the leaves reduced to minute scales. In these respects it closely resembles the similarly parasitic, but unrelated genus, Cassytha. From mid-summer to early autumn, the vines can produce small fruit that take the same color as the vine, and are approximately the size of a common pea.  It has very low levels of chlorophyll; some species such as Cuscuta reflexa can photosynthesize slightly, while others such as C. europaea are entirely dependent on the host plants for nutrition.

Dodder flowers range in color from white to pink to yellow to cream. Some flower in the early summer, others later, depending on the species. The seeds are minute and produced in large quantities. They have a hard coating, and typically can survive in the soil for 5–10 years, sometimes longer.

Dodder seeds sprout at or near the surface of the soil. Although dodder germination can occur without a host, it has to reach a green plant quickly and is adapted to grow towards the nearby plants by following chemosensory clues. If a plant is not reached within 5 to 10 days of germination, the dodder seedling will die. Before a host plant is reached, the dodder, as other plants, relies on food reserves in the embryo; the cotyledons, though present, are vestigial.

Parasitism
After a dodder attaches itself to a plant, it wraps itself around it. If the host contains food beneficial to dodder, the dodder produces haustoria that insert themselves into the vascular system of the host. The vestigial root of the dodder in the soil then dies. The dodder can grow and attach itself to multiple plants. In tropical areas, it can grow more or less continuously and may reach high into the canopy of shrubs and trees; in cold temperate regions, it is an annual plant and is restricted to relatively low vegetation that can be reached by new seedlings each spring.

Dodder is parasitic on a very wide variety of plants, including a number of agricultural and horticultural crop species, such as alfalfa, lespedeza, flax, clover, potatoes, chrysanthemum, dahlia, helenium, trumpet vine, ivy and petunias. It is an ectoparasite and is categorized as holoparasitic plant, or a plant that is non-photosynthetic and is completely dependent on a host. 

Dodder ranges in severity based on its species and the species of the host, the time of attack, and whether any viruses are also present in the host plant. By debilitating the host plant, dodder decreases the ability of plants to resist viral diseases, and dodder can also spread plant diseases from one host to another if it is attached to more than one plant. This is of economic concern in agricultural systems, where an annual drop of 10% yield can be devastating. There has been an emphasis on dodder vine control in order to manage plant diseases in the field.

Host location
A report published in Science in 2006 demonstrated that dodder use airborne volatile organic compound cues to locate their host plants. Seedlings of C. pentagona exhibit positive growth responses to volatiles released by tomato and other species of host plants. When given a choice between volatiles released by the preferred host tomato and the non-host wheat, the parasite grew toward the former. Further experiments demonstrated attraction to a number of individual compounds released by host plants and repellence by one compound released by wheat. These results do not rule out the possibility that other cues, such as light, may also play a role in host location.

Host defenses
Less is known about host defenses against dodder and other parasitic plants than is known about plant defenses against herbivores and pathogens.  In one study, tomato plants were found to employ complex mechanisms to defend against dodder.  Two pathways, using jasmonic acid and salicylic acid, were activated in response to attack by Cuscuta pentagona.  Dodder attack was also found to induce production of volatiles, including 2-carene, α-pinene, limonene, and β-phellandrene.  It is not known if or how these volatiles defend the host, but they could potentially interfere with the dodder's ability to locate and select hosts.  Also, the presence of trichomes on the tomato stem effectively blocks the dodder from attaching to the stem.

Prevention and treatment

Many countries have laws prohibiting import of dodder seed, requiring crop seeds to be free of dodder seed contamination. Before planting, all clothes should be inspected for dodder seed when moving from an infested area to a non-infested crop. When dealing with an infested area, swift action is necessary. Recommendations include planting a non-host crop for several years after the infestation, pulling up host crops immediately, particularly before the dodder produces seed, and use of preemergent herbicides such as Dacthal in the spring. Examples of non-host crops include grasses and many other monocotyledons. If dodder is found before it chokes a host plant, it may be simply removed from the soil. If choking has begun, the host plant must be pruned significantly below the dodder infestation, as dodder is versatile and able to grow back from its haustoria.

Use in Chinese traditional medicine

C. chinensis seeds have long been used for osteoporosis in China and some other Asian countries. C. chinensis is a commonly used traditional Chinese medicine which is believed to strengthen the liver and kidneys. Cuscuta species are also used as medicine in Himalayan regional medical traditions.

See also
 List of Cuscuta species

Gallery

References

Further reading

External links

Costea, M. 2007–onwards. Digital Atlas of Cuscuta (Convolvulaceae)
Cuscuta on Parasitic Plant Connection

 Flora of China: Cuscuta
 Lanini, W. T., et al. Dodder. Pest Notes Jan 2002: 1–3. 15 July 2005. Online (pdf file).
 Swift, C. E. Cuscuta and Grammica species – Dodder: A Plant Parasite. Colorado State University Cooperative Extension. Online.
 Dodder (Cuscuta species). Weed Listings. 2005. Online.
 Medicinal uses of Cuscuta in Armenia
 Chamovitz, D.  Common Scents: Plants Constantly Catch a Whiff of Their Neighbors' Perfume. Scientific American May 22, 2012.

 
Convolvulaceae genera
Parasitic plants